Leprechaun is a 1993 American Comedy horror film written and directed by Mark Jones, and starring Warwick Davis in the title role, with Jennifer Aniston in her film debut.  Davis plays a vengeful leprechaun who believes a family has stolen his pot of gold. As he hunts them, they attempt to locate his gold to mollify him.

Originally intended as straight horror, Davis injected humor into his role, and reshoots added increased gore to appeal to older audiences. Leprechaun was the first in-house production at Trimark Pictures for theatrical exhibition; it earned a domestic gross of $8.6 million against a budget of roughly $1 million and became a cult film. While initial reviews were negative, the commercial success prompted a series of films.

Plot
In 1983, Dan O'Grady returns to his home in North Dakota from a trip to his native Ireland, where he stole the pot of gold from a leprechaun he interrogated. After burying the gold, O'Grady discovers that the evil leprechaun has followed him home and murdered his wife. O'Grady uses a four-leaf clover to suppress the leprechaun's powers and trap him inside a crate. Before he can burn him, he suffers a stroke.

Ten years later, J. D. Redding and his teenage daughter Tory rent the O'Grady farmhouse for the summer. Contract workers Nathan Murphy, his 10-year-old brother Alex, and their dimwitted friend Ozzie Jones help re-paint the farmhouse. While looking around the basement, Ozzie hears the leprechaun's cry for help and mistakes him for a little child. He brushes the old four-leaf clover off the crate, freeing the leprechaun. The leprechaun tells Ozzie that he works as a shoemaker in Ireland, but came to America looking for his gold. After failing to convince the others that he met a leprechaun, Ozzie spots a rainbow and chases it, believing that he will find a pot of gold at the end. Alex accompanies him for fear that Ozzie might hurt himself. A bag of one hundred gold coins magically appears before Ozzie. After Ozzie tests the gold and accidentally swallows a coin, they stash it in an old well and plot to keep it for themselves, hoping to fix Ozzie's brain.

At the farm, the leprechaun lures J. D. into a trap by imitating a cat, biting and injuring his hand. Tory and the others rush him to the hospital, and the leprechaun follows on a tricycle. Alex and Ozzie visit a pawn shop to see if the gold is pure, and the leprechaun kills Joe the shop owner for stealing his gold and shines the dead shop owner's shoes before leaving. The leprechaun fixes himself a small go-kart and goes back to the farmhouse, getting pulled over by a police officer on the way back for speeding. The police officer gets chased by the leprechaun into the woods, eventually getting killed by the leprechaun in the process. The leprechaun returns to the farmhouse, where he searches for his gold and shines every shoe that he finds. After leaving J. D. at the hospital, the group drives back to the farmhouse. Finding it ransacked, Nathan checks outside, where he is injured by a bear trap set by the leprechaun. The group fights the leprechaun outside, ganging up and beating him up with sticks and stone.

After finding a shotgun in the farmhouse, they shoot the leprechaun several times. When this has no effect, they attempt to flee the farm, but their truck's engine has been sabotaged by the leprechaun. After ramming the truck with the go-kart, the leprechaun terrorizes the group until Ozzie reveals that he and Alex found the pot of gold. Tory recovers the bag from the well and gives it to the leprechaun. Believing the worst to be over, they leave for the hospital. While counting his gold, the leprechaun discovers that he is missing the last coin that Ozzie swallowed. Thinking that they have tricked him, he menaces them until Ozzie tells them about O'Grady, who was taken to a nursing home after his stroke. The group distracts the leprechaun by throwing dirty shoes around, which the leprechaun can't resist but to go and shine them, while Tory gets into her jeep and drives off. Tory visits the home to learn how to kill the leprechaun.

At the nursing home, the leprechaun pretends to be O'Grady. After he chases Tory to an elevator, the leprechaun throws O'Grady's bloodied body down the shaft as Tory flees. Before dying, O'Grady tells her that the only way to kill the leprechaun is with a four-leaf clover, which happens to grow in a big batch outside the farm. Tory returns to the farmhouse, where she searches for a clover until she is attacked by the leprechaun; Nathan and Ozzie save her. Ozzie reveals that he swallowed the last gold coin, and the leprechaun critically wounds him trying to get it. Before the leprechaun can kill Ozzie, Alex takes a four-leaf clover Tory has found, sticks it to a wad of gum, and shoots it into the leprechaun's mouth, causing him to melt away. The leprechaun falls into the well, but his skeleton climbs out to continue menacing the group. Nathan pushes the leprechaun back into the well and blows up both the well and the leprechaun with gasoline. As the cops arrive in the morning and investigate the remains of the well, the leprechaun vows he will not rest until he recovers every last piece of his gold.

Cast 

 Warwick Davis as The Leprechaun
 Jennifer Aniston as Tory Redding
 Ken Olandt as Nathan Murphy
 Mark Holton as Ozzie Jones
 Robert Hy Gorman as Alex Murphy
 David Permenter as Deputy Tripet
 William Newman as Sheriff Roy Cronin
 Shay Duffin as Dan O'Grady
 Pamela Mant as Mrs. O'Grady
 John Sanderford as J.D. Redding
 John Voldstad as Joe

Production 

Mark Jones, the writer-director, had a career in American television shows. Desiring to make a film, he decided that a low budget horror film was his best opportunity. Jones was inspired by the Lucky Charms commercials to create a leprechaun character, only his twist was to turn the character into an antagonist. Jones was further influenced by the film Critters, which featured a small antagonist. Jones brought the concept to Trimark, who were looking to get into film production and distribution. Leprechaun became the first film produced in-house by Trimark to be theatrically released. Entertainment Weekly quoted the budget at "just under $1 million". In an interview with Fangoria, Jones stated that he began writing the script in 1985 and spent a long time developing the Leprechaun character, which he initially envisioned as a "horrible, murderous creature", but which became a more comedic and developed character before filming began. Warwick Davis, who had experienced a dry spell after playing the protagonist in Willow, liked the script and was excited to play against type. Jennifer Aniston, who was an unknown at the time, impressed Jones, and he fought to have her cast.

Shooting occurred from October 28-December 3, 1991, and beginning at Valencia Studios, where Terminator 2: Judgment Day had recently finished production. Several violent scenes were filmed at Big Sky Ranch, where Little House on the Prairie and The Waltons were shot. Davis later said it felt "a little blasphemous". Davis performed most of his own stunts. For the scene where Davis chases Aniston in a wheelchair, Aniston had to run in slow motion so that Davis could keep up with her, as he had trouble manipulating the wheels. The film was initially more of a straightforward horror film, but Davis sought to add more comedic elements. Jones agreed with this tonal shift, and they shot it as a horror comedy. Several scenes had to be re-shot after the producers insisted that the film be made gorier to appeal to older audiences.

Gabe Bartalos performed the make-up effects. Trimark contacted Bartalos to produce a sample. Bartalos's early efforts were not to his liking, and he pushed the design in a more grotesque direction, as that was what he wanted to see on the screen as a horror fan. Bartalos's design impressed Trimark, and he got the account. Applying the make-up took three hours, and taking it off took another 40 minutes. Davis described the experience as "not a pleasant sensation". To pass the time while the make-up was being applied, Davis said he had bizarre conversations with Bartalos, with whom he got along well. Davis was conscious of the need to stay relaxed and not move, and he channelled his confidence that the make-up effects were properly applied into his acting.

Release 
Leading up to the film's release, Trimark engaged in an aggressive marketing campaign, partnering with the National Basketball Association, American Stock Exchange, and, after failing to secure deals with either corporate headquarters, individual franchisees of Domino's Pizza and Subway. Leprechaun opened on January 8, 1993, in 620 theatres and took in $2,493,020 its opening week, ultimately earning $8,556,940 in the United States. Vidmark released it on VHS in April, and it sold over 100,000 copies. The film score was released on March 9 by Intrada Records. The film was released on DVD in August 1998. Lionsgate released a triple feature collection on March 11, 2008. All seven films in the series were released on Blu-ray in a collection in September 2014. The film is often broadcast on cable channels such as Syfy on Saint Patrick's Day.

Sequels and reboot 

Leprechaun was followed by five sequels: Leprechaun 2 (1994), Leprechaun 3 (1995), Leprechaun 4: In Space (1997), Leprechaun in the Hood (2000), and Leprechaun: Back 2 tha Hood (2003). In 2014, a reboot, Leprechaun: Origins was released. After Leprechaun 2s theatrical gross disappointed Trimark, Leprechaun 3 was released direct-to-video. Origins was theatrically released. Leprechaun Returns was released on DVD on December 11, 2018, serving as a direct sequel to the original film. The film stars Linden Porco as Lubdan the Leprechaun, and Mark Holton as Ozzie Jones, who reprised the role from the first film, and directed by Steven Kostanski.

Reception
On release, critical reception to the film was negative. Writing for The Deseret News, Chris Hicks said that the film should have been released direct-to-video. Also criticizing Trimark's release of the film, The Austin Chronicles Marc Savlov called it clichéd, uninteresting, and an "utter waste of perfectly good Kodak film stock". Internet-based critic James Berardinelli called it "unwatchable" and not even enjoyably bad, and Matt Bourjaily of the Chicago Tribune wrote that the film "has brought new meaning to the term 'bad'". At the Los Angeles Daily News, Robert Strauss called it "as witless and worthless a horror film as could possibly be conjured". Pittsburgh Post-Gazette critic Ron Weiskind called the film incompetent and criticized the film's acting, lack of suspense, and production values.

Michael Wilmington of the Los Angeles Times called the cast "the usual all-formula grab-bag", and The Washington Posts Richard Harrington said the human actors are all bland. Berardinelli described the characters as "a group of morons who act like they flunked kindergarten" but said Aniston "might be competent" in a better film. Weiskind instead called Aniston's character a "Beverly Hills brat" who audiences will want to die. Of Davis, Harrington wrote that he "imbues a weak character with a strong presence", saying the film is only interesting while Davis is on-screen. Harrington concludes that the film is notable only for Davis' performance.  Vincent Canby of The New York Times called the leprechaun "no more than dangerously cranky" and reminiscent of Chucky from Child's Play; Hicks also described the leprechaun as similar to Chucky. Wilmington wrote that while a killer Leprechaun logically follows a trend of gimmicky antagonists, it is still a bad idea.

Of the film's humor, Wilmington wrote that Leprechaun "isn't dumb enough to be fun". Hicks described the film's humor as "ill-advised slapstick", and Canby wrote that it is "neither scary nor funny". Berardinelli called the leprechaun's one-liners "more idiotic than pithy". Writing in the Chicago Sun-Times, critic Jeff Makos unfavorably compared the film's tone to that of Tremors, which he posited as an influence. Makos said Davis does his best to be funny, but the film has no funny jokes, making audience feedback probably more entertaining than the film itself. The use of Lucky Charms as humor also received commentary. Harrington wrote that Jones is "so bereft of inventive ideas that he refers to Lucky Charms cereal not once but three times", and Bourjaily criticized the Lucky Charms jokes as unfunny.

Berardinelli said director Mark Jones has no style evident in the film. Wilmington described it as a "dingy, drab, pointless little movie ... made without flair or imagination, seemingly enervated by its own bad taste and low intentions". Canby called the screenplay and direction amateurish, and Hicks wrote that Jones is bereft of ideas and should go back to his day job, describing the plot as "by-the-numbers killings with no rhyme or reason". Harrington wrote that the film "has major continuity and credibility problems". Strauss identified the theme as anti-greed but said the writing is "simultaneously prosaic and murky", causing Jones to miss his mark. Wilmington wrote that the leprechaun's cries for his gold reflects the filmmakers' cynical desire for box-office success. Sight & Sound described Leprechaun as a film which seems to have no concept of a target audience: "Jones wants this to be a lively romp for older kids in the mould of Time Bandits...but also wants to corner the lucrative horror market". The review concluded: "Unsuitable for adults or kids, this is ultimately for completists". Harrington called the make-up "quite evil-looking", though Strauss wrote that "effects are strictly so-so".

Rotten Tomatoes, a review aggregator, reports that 27% of 15 critics gave the film a positive review with an average rating of 4.1/10. On Metacritic, the film has a score of 17 out of 100 based on 7 critics, indicating "overwhelming dislike". A 2014 retrospective from Entertainment Weekly identified it as Aniston's worst role to date, and Aniston herself has expressed embarrassment over the film. In 2009, Tanya Gold of The Guardian selected it as one of her ten favorite scary films to watch on Halloween.

Disagreeing with his colleagues in 1993, Luke Y. Thompson of the New Times opined: "The perfect high-concept comedic slasher, and it's still Jennifer Aniston's best film to date".

References

Footnotes

Sources

External links 
 

1993 films
1993 horror films
1990s comedy horror films
American comedy horror films
American independent films
1990s English-language films
American supernatural horror films
Films set in 1983
Films set in 1993
Films set on farms
Films set in North Dakota
Films shot in California
Trimark Pictures films
Leprechaun (film series)
Films scored by Kevin Kiner
Films scored by Robert J. Walsh
1993 directorial debut films
1993 comedy films
1990s monster movies
American monster movies
1993 independent films
Films about father–daughter relationships
American exploitation films
Films directed by Mark Jones
1990s American films